Acanthodactylus arabicus, commonly called the Arabian fringe-fingered lizard, is a species of lizard in the family Lacertidae. The species is endemic to southern Yemen.

Habitat
A. arabicus is a common species inhabiting deserts and dry shrublands with sandy substrates.

Reproduction
A. arabicus is oviparous.

References

Further reading
Boulenger GA (1918). "Sur les lézards du genre Acanthodactylus Wiegm." Bulletin de la Société Zoologique de France 43: 143-155. (Acanthodactylus cantoris Var. arabicus, new variety, p. 154). (in French).
Salvador A (1982). "A revision of the lizards of the genus Acanthodactylus (Sauria: Lacertidae)". Bonner Zoologische Monographien (16): 1-167. (Acanthodactylus arabicus, new status, pp. 143–145, Figures 95-97 + Map 29 on p. 142). (in English, with an abstract in German).

Acanthodactylus
Reptiles of the Arabian Peninsula
Lizards of Asia
Reptiles described in 1918
Taxa named by George Albert Boulenger